"A Tombstone Every Mile" is a song written by Dan Fulkerson and recorded by American country music artist Dick Curless. It was released in January 1965 as the lead single from the album of the same name. The song stayed at number five for two weeks and spent a total of seventeen weeks on the chart. The song refers to the "Haynesville Woods", an area around the small town of Haynesville in Aroostook County in northern Maine noted for many automobile crashes. Truck drivers would ship potatoes to market in Boston and a dangerous hairpin turn in the route through Haynesville was the inspiration for the song.

Chart performance

Cover versions
Bill Kirchen recorded the song in 1994 and made it the title track of his album, Tombstone Every Mile. He also sang on a live version of the track on
Nick Lowe's 2004 album, Untouched Takeaway.

References

1965 songs
1965 debut singles
Dick Curless songs
Nick Lowe songs
Songs about truck driving
Songs about Maine